Adobe Walls may refer to:
Adobe Walls, Texas, Ghost town in Hutchinson County
First Battle of Adobe Walls, 1864 battle in Hutchinson County
Second Battle of Adobe Walls, 1874 battle in Hutchinson County